The Jungle Book 2 is a 2003 animated adventure film produced by the Australian office at DisneyToon Studios and released by Walt Disney Pictures and Buena Vista Distribution. The theatrical version of the film was released in France on February 5, 2003, and released in the United States on February 14, 2003. The film is a sequel to Walt Disney's 1967 film The Jungle Book, and stars Haley Joel Osment as the voice of Mowgli and John Goodman as the voice of Baloo.

The film was originally produced as a direct-to-video film, but was released theatrically first, similar to the Peter Pan sequel Return to Never Land. It is the fourth animated Disney sequel to have a theatrical release rather than going direct-to-video after The Rescuers Down Under (1990), Fantasia 2000 (1999), and Return to Never Land (2002) and the last one until Ralph Breaks the Internet (2018). The film is not based on The Second Jungle Book. However, they do have several characters in common.

The film received negative reviews directed towards the animation and similarity in plotline to the first film. However, it was a box office success, grossing $135.7 million against a $20 million budget.

Plot
Following the events of the previous film, Mowgli now resides in the "Man-Village" with the girl Shanti who lured him into the village, and he ends up being adopted by the village leader, who has a wife named Messua and a son named Ranjan. However, wanting to return to the exciting life of the jungle, he nearly leads the other children in the village into the jungle, and the village leader punishes him for disobeying what he told Mowgli about not leaving the village and putting them in danger.

Meanwhile, in the jungle, Shere Khan has returned to Baloo and Bagheera's part of the jungle, seeking revenge on Mowgli for defeating him. Baloo enters the Man-Village and takes Mowgli back into the jungle; however, unbeknownst to them, Shere Khan had also enter the village, only to be attacked by the villagers. In the ensuing chase, Shanti and Ranjan sneak into the jungle to rescue Mowgli, believing that Baloo is a rabid animal who has kidnapped him.

Bagheera learns of Mowgli's escape from the village when the humans search the jungle for him, and immediately suspects Baloo. Mowgli instructs Baloo to scare off Shanti should she appear, and bemoans about his boring life in the Man-Village. Baloo and Mowgli journey to King Louie's old temple (King Louie is mentioned to have moved out), for a party. However, when the jungle animals mock Shanti and other aspects of Mowgli's life in the Man-Village, Mowgli angrily leaves. He finds Shanti and Ranjan, but Baloo scares Shanti. When the truth comes out that Mowgli ordered Baloo to scare her, Shanti and Ranjan run away, abandoning Mowgli.

Baloo realizes that Mowgli misses his village life, but when Mowgli tries to make amends with his human friends, they are cornered by Shere Khan. The tiger chases Mowgli and Shanti to an abandoned temple built above a lake of lava. Baloo instructs Bagheera to protect Ranjan while he goes to save Mowgli and Shanti. After confusing Shere Khan by banging several different gongs, Shanti's presence is revealed to Shere Khan. Baloo tackles Shere Khan to the ground, allowing Mowgli and Shanti enough time to escape, but the tiger chases them to a statue across a pit of lava. Shere Khan is trapped within the statue's mouth, and it plummets onto a large stone in the lava below.

With Shere Khan finally thwarted, Baloo decides to let Mowgli return to the Man-Village with Shanti and Ranjan, and Bagheera proudly compliments Baloo for making a wise decision. Upon returning to the Man-Village with Shanti and Ranjan, Mowgli reconciles with the village leader, who apologizes to Mowgli for failing to understand that the jungle was part of his identity. The children return daily to visit Baloo and Bagheera in the jungle.

Voice cast
 Haley Joel Osment as Mowgli, a young boy raised in the jungle, who wants to return there. He was voiced by Bruce Reitherman in the original film, who in turn replaced David Bailey. Jake Thomas auditioned for the role prior to Osment's casting.
 John Goodman as Baloo, a fun-loving sloth bear who is Mowgli's best friend. He was voiced by Phil Harris in the original film.
 Mae Whitman as Shanti, a young girl who is Mowgli's love interest. Darleen Carr provided her singing voice at the end of the original film, and she was also unnamed.
 Bob Joles as Bagheera, a black panther and Mowgli's friend, who is determined to stop Baloo from getting Mowgli out of his village. He was voiced by Sebastian Cabot in the original film.
 Tony Jay as Shere Khan, a man-eating Bengal tiger who wants revenge on Mowgli. He was voiced by George Sanders in the original film. Having previously voiced the role numerous times in the 1990s after he replaced George Sanders, this was Jay’s final reprisal as the character before his death in 2006.
 Phil Collins as Lucky, a slow-witted vulture who mocks Shere Khan.
 John Rhys-Davies as the Village Leader, the stern yet responsible ruler of the Man-Village who serves as Mowgli's adoptive father.
 Veena Bidasha as Messua, the Village Leader's wife who serves as Mowgli's adoptive mother.
 Connor Funk as Ranjan, the son of Messua and the Village Leader who serves as Mowgli's adoptive brother.
 Jim Cummings as Kaa / Colonel Hathi / M.C. Monkey. In the original film, Kaa was voiced by Sterling Holloway, Hathi was voiced by J. Pat O'Malley and M.C. Monkey was voiced by Leo De Lyon and known as Flunkey. Cummings reprises his role as Kaa from the TV series, Jungle Cubs.
 Jimmy Bennett as Hathi Jr. He was voiced by Clint Howard in the original film.
 Jeff Glen Bennett as Buzzie. Hathi's voice actor in the original film, O'Malley, voiced Buzzie in the original film as well.
 Brian Cummings as Flaps. He was voiced by Chad Stuart in the original film.
 Jess Harnell as Dizzy and Ziggy. In the original film, Lord Tim Hudson voiced Dizzy, while Digby Wolfe voiced Ziggy.

Additional voices are provided by an uncredited J. Grant Albrecht, Jeff Bennett, Brian Cummings, Baron Davis, Jess Harnell, and Devika Parikh.

Songs
Songs from the first film were composed by Terry Gilkyson and Richard M. and Robert B. Sherman with new songs by Lorraine Feather, Paul Grabowsky, and Joel McNeely. Marty Stuart reportedly submitted songs for the film during production.

 "I Wan'na Be like You" – Smash Mouth
 "Jungle Rhythm" – Mowgli, Shanti, Ranjan
 "The Bare Necessities" – Baloo
 "Colonel Hathi's March"
 "The Bare Necessities" – Baloo, Mowgli
 "W-I-L-D" – Baloo
 "Jungle Rhythm (Reprise)" – Mowgli
 "The Bear Necessities (Reprise)" – Baloo, Mowgli, Shanti
 "Right Where I Belong" – Windy Wagner

Production
In the 1990s, screenwriting duo Bob Hilgenberg and Rob Muir submitted a Jungle Book 2 screenplay in which Baloo ventured to save his romantic interest from a poacher. Disney ultimately went in a different direction for the sequel.

John Goodman recorded his voice work in New Orleans while Haley Joel Osment recorded his in California. Due to a legal dispute, the character of King Louie from the original Jungle Book could not be included in this film. However, he makes a non-physical appearance as a shadow puppet in the beginning of the film and is briefly mentioned in the middle of the film.
The decision was made to keep Shere Khan in shadow during the beginning of the film to "reflect his 'wounded pride'".

Reception

Critical reception
 
The Jungle Book 2 received generally negative reviews from critics. On review aggregator website Rotten Tomatoes, the film received an approval rating of 19% based on 91 reviews, with an average rating of 4.4/10. The site's critical consensus reads, "This inferior rehash of The Jungle Book should have gone straight to video". On Metacritic, the film has a weighted average score of 38 out of 100 based on 24 critics, indicating "generally unfavorable reviews". Audiences polled by CinemaScore gave the film an average grade of "A–" on an A+ to F scale.

Box office
 
The film was released on February 14, 2003 and opened at #4 in its 4-day opening weekend with $14,109,797. At the end of its run, the film grossed $47,901,582 in the United States and $87,802,017 in foreign countries totaling $135,703,599 worldwide. It could be considered a box office success, based on its $20 million budget.

Home media 
The Jungle Book 2 was released on both VHS and DVD on June 10, 2003. The bonus features included the behind-the-scenes, some music videos, "W-I-L-D", "I Wan'na Be like You" and "Jungle Rhythm", and deleted scenes. It was released again on June 17, 2008 on "Special Edition" DVD. In the United States, the 2008 DVD release sold 126,593 units and grossed  in two weeks. The film was released on Blu-ray on March 18, 2014, following its predecessor's first HD Blu-ray release, as both films were put back in the Disney Vault in January 2017. As of 2022, this sequel has not yet been announced for a DVD/Blu-ray/Digital re-release in North America, unlike the predecessor that was re-released for its 55th anniversary in 2022. To date, this sequel is only available to stream on Disney+.

Cancelled sequel
In 2003, a third installment to The Jungle Book was planned. It would have been about Baloo and Shere Khan being captured and sold off to a Russian circus, and Mowgli, Shanti, Ranjan, and Bagheera deciding to save them both. Over the course of the film, Shere Khan regrets his hatred against humanity after the events of the previous two films because of his capture, and eventually reforms after Mowgli and his friends rescued them. The project never materialized.

References

External links

 
 
 
 
 

2003 films
2003 animated films
2000s adventure comedy films
2000s American animated films
2000s fantasy adventure films
2000s musical comedy films
2000s English-language films
American adventure comedy films
American children's animated adventure films
American children's animated fantasy films
American children's animated musical films
American fantasy comedy films
American musical comedy films
American sequel films
Animated buddy films
Animated films about apes
Animated films about bears
Animated films about tigers
Animated films about snakes
Animated films about orphans
Animated films based on children's books
Australian animated feature films
Australian animated fantasy films
Australian musical comedy films
Australian sequel films
The Jungle Book (franchise)
The Jungle Book films
DisneyToon Studios animated films
American fantasy adventure films
Films scored by Joel McNeely
Films set in India
Films about volcanoes
Films with screenplays by Evan Spiliotopoulos
Walt Disney Pictures films
2000s fantasy comedy films
Animated films about friendship
2003 comedy films